Utopia is a 1983 West German drama film directed by Sohrab Shahid-Saless. It was entered into the 33rd Berlin International Film Festival.

Cast
 Manfred Zapatka as Heinz
 Imke Barnstedt as Renate
 Gundula Petrovska as Rosi
 Gabriele Fischer as Susi
 Johanna Sophia as Helga
 Birgit Anders as Monika

References

External links

1983 films
West German films
1980s German-language films
1983 drama films
German drama films
Films directed by Sohrab Shahid-Saless
1980s German films